Albert Williams Johnson (November 28, 1872 – March 22, 1957) was a United States district judge of the United States District Court for the Middle District of Pennsylvania.

Education and career

Born in Weikert, Pennsylvania, Johnson received an Artium Baccalaureus degree from Bucknell University in 1896 and read law in that year as well. He was an instructor in law at Bucknell University from 1902 to 1926. He was a member of the Pennsylvania House of Representatives from 1901 to 1902, and was a solicitor for the Borough of Lewisburg and Union County, Pennsylvania from 1908 to 1912. He was Presiding Judge for the 17th Judicial District of Pennsylvania from 1912 to 1922. He was solicitor for the Pennsylvania Department of Education from 1922 to 1923.

Federal judicial service

Johnson received a recess appointment from President Calvin Coolidge on May 21, 1925, to a seat on the United States District Court for the Middle District of Pennsylvania vacated by Judge Charles B. Witmer. He was nominated to the same position by President Coolidge on December 8, 1925. He was confirmed by the United States Senate on December 17, 1925, and received his commission the same day. His service terminated on June 28, 1945, due to his resignation.

Resignation

By 1945, Johnson was under investigation by the United States House Judiciary Committee for misconduct. In unusual language, they found he was a “wicked, evil and mendacious judge.” The report of the subcommittee also said that almost “every litigant who had the misfortune to appear before this wicked and malicious judge became the immediate object of a crooked conspiracy whose sole interest was the amount of money that could be extorted from him for justice or the evasion of justice.” Johnson resigned before impeachment.

Death

Johnson died on March 22, 1957.

References

Sources
 

1872 births
1957 deaths
People from Union County, Pennsylvania
Bucknell University alumni
Members of the Pennsylvania House of Representatives
Pennsylvania state court judges
Judges of the United States District Court for the Middle District of Pennsylvania
United States district court judges appointed by Calvin Coolidge
20th-century American judges
United States federal judges admitted to the practice of law by reading law
Pennsylvania politicians convicted of crimes